Echinophryne crassispina, known as the prickly anglerfish, is a species of fish in the family Antennariidae. It was first described in 1918 by Alan Riverstone McCulloch and Edgar Ravenswood Waite from a specimen collected in Spencer Gulf. 

It is endemic to southern Australia, where it ranges from Kangaroo Island to Tasmania. It is a temperate fish native to inshore reefs, and it reaches 7.0 cm (2.8 inches) in total length.

References

External links 

 Echinophryne crassispina occurrence data and images

Antennariidae
Fish described in 1918
Fish of Australia
Taxa named by Allan Riverstone McCulloch
Taxa named by Edgar Ravenswood Waite